Sssh.com is a members-only female erotica site and the first "porn for women" website to be recognized by the mainstream adult industry, winning the XBIZ Award for Best Alternative Website.

History
Sssh.com is a porn for women (feminist pornography) and erotica site that features original HD erotic movies, Original Novels, Audio Plays, Radio Station, VR World, live events and more. The site is run by women for a female audience. The sites content including its movies have all been inspired by its member, via the sites survey, which has been continually running for seventeen years.

The focus of Sssh.com is on chemistry and mutual pleasure, with women in strong character roles taking control of their own pleasure. Founder Angie Rowntree said, "I launched Sssh.com in 1999, for a very simple reason: When I looked around the web at all the different porn sites, and looked around the adult video market at all the different titles and series, I didn’t see much which would appeal to women."

At the 2013 Oscars, female nominees were given a free one-year VIP membership to the site as part of a gift bag.

Selected productions
Gone is a story about love and loss in small town America. Critic Rich Moreland stated, "Angie Rowntree and Sssh.com deserve congratulations for perhaps the most thoughtful and significant porn film this reviewer has ever seen. It stands alone in defining adult film as art." Madeline Blue was nominated for XBIZ's "Best Actress – Couples Release" for her role in the film.
Ellington is a Cinderella story of Cindy Ellington, who is taken advantage of by her stepmother. Her college friend, Joe Prince, tries to help and a romance develops. The movie was featured on ABC's Nightline.

Education
Mindbrowse.com and SexTalkTuesday.com are websites produced by Sssh.com founder Angie Rowntree.

Sex Talk Tuesday is every Tuesday from 3-4PM EST. Each show has a guest moderator who asks questions. Participants share their thoughts and opinions on sex. Past guest moderators have included comedian Margaret Cho, actress CoCo Brown, Holly Randall, adult actress Kendra Sunderland, Showtime's "Gigolo" actor Garen James, Gloria Brame, Ducky DooLittle, Belle Knox, Midori, and Sara Benincasa.

Mindbrowse.com hosts a live streaming show where professionals in the adult industry talk about issues facing the industry. Past guests have included Nick Hawk, Cindy Gallop, Candida Royalle, Jacky St. James and Dr. Chauntelle Tibbals.

Sssh.com was featured in computational neuroscientist Dr. Ogi Ogas’ book A Billion Wicked Thoughts: What the Internet Tells Us About Sexual Relationships.

Media
Sssh.com founder Angie Rowntree is a frequent panel discussion participant at adult industry trade shows, and has been profiled by major media outlets including ABC's Nightline, Cosmopolitan, CNBC, Fox News, and Time Magazine, and Psychology Today.

Awards and nominations

References

External links 

 Official Sssh.com Website

Internet properties established in 1999
American erotica and pornography websites
Women's erotica and pornography
Feminist pornography